The following is a list of hospitals in Eastern Province, Sri Lanka. Five of the biggest government hospitals in the province are controlled by the  central government in Colombo. All other government hospitals in the province are controlled by the provincial government in Trincomalee.

Government hospitals

Teaching hospitals
 Batticaloa Teaching Hospital, Batticaloa District (central government)

District general hospitals
 Ampara District General Hospital, Ampara District (central government)
 Trincomalee District General Hospital, Trincomalee District

Base hospitals (type A)
 Ashraff Memorial Hospital (Kalmunai South Base Hospital), Ampara District (central government)
 Kalmunai North Base Hospital, Ampara District (central government)
 Kantalai Base Hospital, Trincomalee District (central government)
 Kinniya Base Hospital, Trincomalee District (Provincial government)
 Mutur Base Hospital, Trincomalee District (Provincial government)

Base hospitals (type B)
 Akkaraipattu Base Hospital, Ampara District (central government)
 Dehiattakandiya Base Hospital, Ampara District
 Kalavanchikudy Base Hospital, Batticaloa District
 Maha Oya Base Hospital, Ampara District
 Ninthavur District Hospital, Ampara District
 Pottuvil District Hospital, Ampara District
 Sammanthurai Base Hospital, Ampara District
 Thirukkovil Base Hospital, Ampara District
 Valaichchenai Base Hospital, Batticaloa District
 Kattankudy Base Hospital, Batticaloa District

Divisional hospital (Type A) 
 Periyakallar Divisional Hospital, Batticaloa District

Divisional hospitals (type B)
 Arayampathy District Hospital, Batticaloa District
 Chenkalady Rural Hospital, Batticaloa District
 Eravur District Hospital, Batticaloa District
 Karadiyanaru Divisional Hospital, Batticaloa District
 Karaitivu Peripheral Unit, Ampara District
 Manthivu Special Campaign Hospital, Batticaloa District
 Marathamunai Central Dispensary and Maternity Home, Ampara District
 Miravodai Rural Hospital, Batticaloa District
 Palamunai Peripheral Unit, Ampara District
 Sainthamaruthu District Hospital, Ampara District
 Vakarai Peripheral Unit, Batticaloa District

Divisional hospitals (type C)
 Addalachenai Dvisional Hospital, Ampara District
 Central Camp Peripheral Unit, Ampara District
 Damana Central Dispensary and Maternity Home, Ampara District
 Deegavapi Central Dispensary, Ampara District
 Gomarankadawala Rural Hospital, Trincomalee District
 Irrakam Central Dispensary, Ampara District
 Kilivetti Rural Hospital, Trincomalee District
 Kuchchaveli Rural Hospital, Trincomalee District
 Lahugala Rural Hospital, Ampara District
 Mandapathady Rural Hospital, Batticaloa District
 Nilaveli Rural Hospital, Trincomalee District
 Oluvil Central Dispensary and Maternity Home, Ampara District
 Padavi Siripura Peripheral Unit, Trincomalee District
 Palameenmadu Rural Hospital, Batticaloa District
 Palamunai Divisional Hospital, Batticaloa District
 Panama Central Dispensary and Maternity Home, Ampara District
 Pulmoddai Peripheral Unit, Trincomalee District
 Senarathpura Central Dispensary and Maternity Home, Ampara District
 Serunuvara Rural Hospital, Trincomalee District
 Thampalakamam Peripheral Unit, Trincomalee District
 Thoppur Central Dispensary, Trincomalee District
 Thottama Rural Hospital, Ampara District
 Wadinagala Rural Hospital, Ampara District

Primary medical care units
 Ambagahawela Central Dispensary, Ampara District
 Annamalai Central Dispensary, Ampara District
 Bakiella Central Dispensary, Batticaloa District
 Batticaloa Chest Clinic, Batticaloa District
 Battukachchiya Central Dispensary, Trincomalee District
 Cheddipalayam Central Dispensary and Maternity Home, Batticaloa District
 Chenaikudiyruppu Central Dispensary, Ampara District
 China Bay Central Dispensary, Trincomalee District
 Ganthalawa Central Dispensary, Trincomalee District
 Himadhurawa Central Dispensary, Ampara District
 Kachchakodithivu Central Dispensary, Trincomalee District
 Kaluthavalai Central Dispensary, Batticaloa District
 Kanyanodai Central Dispensary, Batticaloa District
 Kappalthurai Central Dispensary, Trincomalee District
 Kathiraveli Central Dispensary, Batticaloa District
 Kavattamunai Central Dispensary, Batticaloa District
 Kekuluwela Central Dispensary, Ampara District
 Koddamunnai Central Dispensary, Batticaloa District
 Kokkadichcholai Central Dispensary and Maternity Home, Batticaloa District
 Koknahara Central Dispensary, Ampara District
 Komari Central Dispensary, Ampara District
 Lihiniyagama Central Dispensary, Ampara District
 Madawalanda Central Dispensary, Ampara District
 Mahadivulwewa Central Dispensary and Maternity Home, Trincomalee District
 Makilavedduvan Central Dispensary, Batticaloa District
 Makiloor Central Dispensary, Batticaloa District
 Malwatta Central Dispensary, Ampara District
 Mandur Central Dispensary and Maternity Home, Batticaloa District
 Mangalagama Central Dispensary, Ampara District
 Mankerni Central Dispensary, Batticaloa District
 Mavadivenpu Central Dispensary, Batticaloa District
 Mavadivenpu Mental Health Unit, Batticaloa District
 Meerakerny Central Dispensary, Batticaloa District
 Morawewa Central Dispensary and Maternity Home, Trincomalee District
 Mullipothana Central Dispensary, Trincomalee District
 Muwangala Central Dispensary, Ampara District
 Naduoothu Central Dispensary, Trincomalee District
 Namal Oya Central Dispensary, Ampara District
 Nawamadagama Central Dispensary, Ampara District
 Palayadivaddai Central Dispensary, Batticaloa District
 Panankadu Central Dispensary, Ampara District
 Pannalgama Central Dispensary, Ampara District
 Paragahakele Central Dispensary, Ampara District
 Plamunai Central Dispensary, Batticaloa District
 Sampalthivu Central Dispensary, Trincomalee District
 Sadunpura Central Dispensary, Ampara District
 Sampur Central Dispensary, Trincomalee District
 Santhively Central Dispensary, Batticaloa District
 Selvanayagapuram Central Dispensary, Trincomalee District
 Seruvila Central Dispensary and Maternity Home, Trincomalee District
 Siripura Central Dispensary, Ampara District
 Sorikalmunai Central Dispensary, Ampara District
 Thiraimadu Central Dispensary, Batticaloa District
 Thiriyai Central Dispensary, Trincomalee District
 Thuraimulavanie Central Dispensary and Maternity Home, Batticaloa District
 Uhana Central Dispensary, Ampara District
 Unnichchei Central Dispensary, Batticaloa District
 Wan Ela Central Dispensary and Maternity Home, Trincomalee District
 Weeragoda Central Dispensary, Ampara District
 Weheragala Central Dispensary, Ampara District

Unclassified
 Kakkamunai Central Dispensary, Trincomalee District
 Kalmunaikudy District Hospital, Ampara District
 Mawanawela Central Dispensary, Ampara District
 Padiyatalava Peripheral Unit, Ampara District
 Periyaneelavanai Central Dispensary and Maternity Home, Ampara District
 Pullumellai Central Dispensary, Batticaloa District

Private hospitals

1. Prabhodha Hospital (Pvt) Ltd, Ampara , Ampara District

2. Genius Hospital (pvt) Ltd, Akkaraipattu, Ampara District

3. Mediland Hospital, Kalmunai, Ampara district

See also
 List of hospitals in Sri Lanka

References

 
Eastern